The 1995 Rio de Janeiro motorcycle Grand Prix was the eleventh round of the 1995 Grand Prix motorcycle racing season. It took place on 17 September 1995 at the Autódromo Internacional Nelson Piquet.

500 cc classification

250 cc classification

125 cc classification

References

Rio de Janeiro motorcycle Grand Prix
Rio de Janeiro
Rio de Janeiro Grand Prix